The Thorn Birds: The Missing Years is a 1996 CBS miniseries directed by Kevin James Dobson. Adapted from the 1977 novel The Thorn Birds by Colleen McCullough, it tells the story of the nineteen years between Dane's birth and Ralph's return to Australia. These years are unaccounted for in both the original 1983 ABC miniseries and the novel.

Plot
It is ten years after the birth of Dane, and Meghann "Meggie" O'Neill (Amanda Donohoe) is forced to run Drogheda basically on her own, since all her brothers went off to fight in World War II. To make matters worse, a two-year drought has struck the area. One day, Meggie's estranged husband, Luke, arrives on Drogheda and begs forgiveness. Meggie, lonely, in need of a man to run the ranch and to be a father for her children, reluctantly takes Luke back, and she becomes pregnant once again.

Father Ralph de Bricassart (Richard Chamberlain) decides to become a full-time priest to fulfill his deep love for God. He has been using his church in Rome as a haven for Jewish war refugees. After Ralph uses some of Mary Carson's estate money to send a young orphan to America, the church "punishes" him by forcing him to return to Drogheda to guard the church's bequeathed property and to convince the Australian government to accept more refugees.

Father Ralph arrives in Australia unannounced and Luke is not pleased to see him. Luke demands Meggie move with him immediately to a ramshackle cabin on the farm he purchased, just to get Meggie away from Ralph. When Meggie resists, Luke strikes her, causing her to miscarry.

Meggie decides she can never return to Luke, but Luke declares he only returned for Dane, whom he thinks is his son. Meggie takes Luke to court for custody of Dane. The judge, a Protestant biased against Dane's desire to be a priest, awards custody to Luke, with Meggie refusing to ruin Ralph by announcing Dane is his and not Luke's son. She decides to avoid scandal, confronting Ralph with the fact that he loves God more than her, that he will always be devoted to a greater good. She has raised her son without the knowledge of who his father is.

The rains finally come, and Ralph and Meggie do their best to round up the animals before the flood comes. Unable to make it back to Drogheda in the downpour, the two find refuge in a small cabin, where a night of romance ensues.

Meggie's mother, Fee, in a last-ditch attempt to reclaim Dane, confronts Luke with the truth—Dane is not his son but the son of Father Ralph. Luke swears never to reveal this fact for fear of losing Meggie and his children to Ralph forever.

Luke confronts Ralph and starts a fight, declaring if Ralph can beat him he can have Dane. Ralph defeats Luke, and torn and bleeding, Luke returns Dane to Meggie.

Production
Producer David L. Wolper explained why this story was not included in the original 1983 The Thorn Birds miniseries: "there were so many hours that we could do for the original. We decided in the original that after he made love to Meggie that we would just cut ahead to the children."
After reruns during the summer of 1993 proved popular Wolper decided there was an audience for more Thorn Birds.

The miniseries was filmed entirely on location in Australia, unlike the original, which was filmed in California.

Reception
The Deseret News called it a travesty, and said that the story "not only pales in comparison to the original but often directly contradicts events in both the book and the first miniseries". Variety wrote that while it would take a miracle to top the original, "the love story is still involving". They are critical of the script, for failing to highlight Meggie's motivations, saying the details "left unexpressed, leads to viewer frustration".

Inconsistencies
In the original The Thorn Birds Dane, at age 17, shocks Meggie and Father Ralph with his desire to become a priest. In The Thorn Birds: The Missing Years, Dane talks about little else at age 10.

In the original, Meggie's mother, Fee (played by Jean Simmons), is a deliberate, slow-talking, aristocratic woman who "lost faith in her church", while in The Missing Years, Fee (played by Julia Blake) is a religious, rapid-talking gossip-bearer.

Luke turns from a drunken womaniser who hangs around his mates all day to a loner who lives by himself on a farm.

Father Ralph offers to leave the church and marry Meggie, something that he never implied in the original. She finally gets the love she was hungering for, and Father Ralph breaks his vow of chastity.

Meggie has two surviving brothers in the original: Jack and Bob, while in The Missing Years Frank and Jack are mentioned.

References

External links
 
 

1990s American television miniseries
Television shows based on Australian novels
Television series by The Wolper Organization
1996 films
Films directed by Kevin James Dobson
1990s English-language films